Church economy is either

 An Eastern Orthodox bishop's discretionary power to dispense with rules that parish priests must otherwise rigidly follow; see economy (Eastern Orthodoxy); or
 Church economics. (disambiguation)